Seyyedabad-e Asadollah Khan (also Romanized as Seyyedābād-e Āsadollah Khān; also known as Seyyedābād-e Āsadollahkhān) is a village in Binalud Rural District, in the Central District of Nishapur County, Razavi Khorasan Province, Iran. At the 2006 census, its population was 77, in 21 families.

References 

Populated places in Nishapur County